The 2014–15 season was Falkirk's second consecutive season in the Scottish Championship and their fifth consecutive season in the second tier of Scottish football, having been relegated from the Scottish Premier League at the end of season 2009–10. Falkirk also competed in the Challenge Cup, League Cup and the Scottish Cup.

Summary

Season
In their first season under the management of Peter Houston, Falkirk finished fifth in the Scottish Championship and reached the Scottish Cup Final, losing to Inverness Caledonian Thistle.

Results & fixtures

Scottish Championship

Scottish Challenge Cup

Scottish League Cup

Scottish Cup

Player statistics

 

  

|-
|colspan="12"|Players who left the club during the 2014–15 season
|-

|}

Team statistics

League table

Division summary

Transfers

Players in

Players out

References

Falkirk
Falkirk F.C. seasons